Bosihe (Mandarin: 波斯河镇) is a town in Yajiang County, Garzê Tibetan Autonomous Prefecture, Sichuan, China. In 2010, Bosihe had a total population of 1,162: 605 males and 557 females: 259 aged under 14, 795 aged between 15 and 65 and 108 aged over 65.

References 

Towns in Sichuan
Populated places in the Garzê Tibetan Autonomous Prefecture